Philiris ziska is a species of butterfly of the family Lycaenidae. It is found in New Guinea and Queensland, Australia.

The wingspan is about 25 mm. Adult males are blue with black edges, while the females are black with a large white patch on the wings.

The larvae feed on Trophis scandens.

Subspecies
Philiris ziska ziska (Waigeu, West Irian to Papua New Guinea)
Philiris ziska halmaheira Cassidy, 2003
Philiris ziska titeus D'Abrera, 1971 (Australia: Queensland)

References

Butterflies described in 1898
Luciini
Butterflies of Australia
Taxa named by Henley Grose-Smith